The 2010 World Ladies Snooker Championship was the 2010 edition of the World Women's Snooker Championship, first held in 1976, and was played at Cambridge Snooker Centre from 3 to 7 April. The tournament was won by Reanne Evans, who achieved her sixth consecutive world title by defeating Maria Catalano 5–1 in the final. Evans received £1,000 prize money for her win. She also made the highest  of the tournament, 78.

There were four round-robin qualifying groups, three of five players each and one of four players, with the top two players in each group progressing into the knockout stage to play one of the top eight seeds.

Main Draw

References 

2010 in English sport
2010 in snooker
2010 in women's sport
International sports competitions hosted by England
April 2010 sports events in the United Kingdom